The Dalian Metro is a rapid transit system serving Dalian City, Liaoning Province, China.

Stations

References

Stations
Dalian Metro stations
Dalian